Lin Qiang (born 13 January 1960) is a former Chinese footballer.

Club career
Born in 1960 in Wuhan, Hubei, Lin joined Hubei Youth Football Team in 1976. During his time playing youth football in Hubei, Lin was "borrowed" by Guangdong Youth for a tour of Japan. Lin later played senior football for Hubei Football Team. Following retirement, Lin joined the police, managing the Wuhan Police Football Team.

International career
On 4 December 1983, Lin made his debut, as a substitute, for China in a 2–1 win against Australia.

International goals
Scores and results list China's goal tally first.

References

1960 births
Footballers from Wuhan
Association football wingers
Chinese footballers
Chinese football managers
China international footballers
1984 AFC Asian Cup players
Living people